Erika Sauzeau (born 1 August 1982) is a French adaptive rower who competes at international rowing competitions. She is a European silver medalist and a Paralympic bronze medalist in the mixed coxed four.

References

External links

1982 births
Living people
Paralympic rowers of France
French female rowers
Rowers at the 2020 Summer Paralympics
Medalists at the 2020 Summer Paralympics
Paralympic bronze medalists for France
21st-century French women